North Coast Women's Care Medical Group, Inc. v. San Diego County Superior Court is a case decided before the California Supreme Court on August 18, 2008, ruling that physicians must offer IUI infertility services to gays and lesbians despite religious objections or find a colleague in their office who will do so.

The suit was brought by Guadalupe Benitez, a lesbian from Oceanside, California, who was treated in 1999 for infertility at the only clinic in her area that accepted her insurance. Two physicians at the North Coast Women's Care Medical Group, Christine Brody and Douglas Fenton, refused to perform an artificial insemination treatment on Benitez because they claimed that such treatment to an unmarried person violated their Christian religious beliefs.

After she was denied treatment, Benitez argued in court that the physicians and the clinic really based their decision on her being a lesbian. This violated the Unruh Civil Rights Act, a state law prohibiting discrimination based on sex, gender, sexual orientation, race, and ethnicity covering places of business and public accommodation; marital status was not addressed until 2006. She won at the trial court level in San Diego, but that decision was later overturned by a state appeals court. The California State Supreme Court's decision favoring Benitez was unanimous.

Writing for the court, Justice Kennard said:

[..] California's Unruh Civil Rights Act, from which defendant physicians seek religious exemption, is "a valid and neutral law of general applicability" (Smith, supra, 494 U.S. at p. 879). As relevant in this case, it requires business establishments to provide "full and equal accommodations, advantages, facilities, privileges, or services" to all persons notwithstanding their sexual orientation. (Civ. Code, § 51, subds. (a) & (b).) Accordingly, the First Amendment's right to the free exercise of religion does not exempt defendant physicians here from conforming their conduct to the Act's antidiscrimination requirements even if compliance poses an incidental conflict with defendants' religious beliefs. (Lukumi, supra, 508 U.S. at p. 531; Smith, supra, at p. 879.)

References 

United States free exercise of religion case law
United States substantive due process case law
United States LGBT rights case law
California state case law
2008 in California
2008 in United States case law
LGBT rights in California
2008 in LGBT history